Tongues and Tails is the debut album by American singer-songwriter Sophie B. Hawkins, released in 1992.

Production 
The title is presumably derived from Act II, Scene i, Line 214 of The Taming of the Shrew, in which Petruchio asks Kate, "What, with my tongue in your tail?"

Track listing
All tracks written by Sophie B. Hawkins, except "I Want You," written by Bob Dylan.

"Damn I Wish I Was Your Lover" – 5:23
"California Here I Come" – 4:38
"Mysteries We Understand" – 4:40
"Savior Child" – 4:45
"Carry Me" – 4:36
"I Want You" – 5:19
"Before I Walk on Fire" – 4:58
"We Are One Body" – 4:49
"Listen" – 3:31
"Live and Let Love" – 4:13
"Don't Stop Swaying" – 5:31

Personnel
Sophie B. Hawkins – keyboards, vocals
Eric Bazilian – guitar
Café – percussion
Mino Cinelu – percussion
Rick DiFonzo – guitar
Mark Egan – bass
Roger Greenawalt – twelve-string guitar
Omar Hakim – drums
Gary Lucas – guitar
Sammy Merendino – rhythm, rhythm collage
Ralph Schuckett – keyboards
Peter Wood – synthesizer
Frederick Zlotkin – cello

Production
Studio: Messina Music
Producers: Rick Chertoff, Ralph Schuckett
Engineers: John Agnello, Steve Churchyard, Stewart Lerman, Martin Brass
Assistant engineers: Ted Trewhella, Michael White
Mixing: Steve Churchyard, David Leonard
Mastering: George Marino
Art direction: Christopher Austopchuk, Nicky Lindeman
Paintings: Sophie B. Hawkins

Charts
Album

Singles

Notes

External links
 Full lyrics of all tracks at official website

Sophie B. Hawkins albums
1992 debut albums
Albums produced by Rick Chertoff
Columbia Records albums